Rubije is a small village north of Komen in the Littoral region of Slovenia.

References

External links

Rubije on Geopedia

Populated places in the Municipality of Komen